Comeau may refer to:

People
 Anselm-François Comeau, 19th Century Nova Scotia politician
 Andy Comeau, actor
 Ashley Comeau, actor, improviser, producer
 Blake Comeau, hockey player
 Carol Comeau, teacher
 Chuck Comeau, drummer for Simple Plan
 Ed Comeau, former coach of the Orlando Titans
Fredric Gary Comeau, Writer and singer-songwriter
 Gerald Comeau, Canadian Senator 
 Joseph Willie Comeau, Nova Scotia politician
 Joey Comeau, writer
 Marcel Comeau, Canadian ice hockey coach and NHL executive
 Phil Comeau, film director
 Rey Comeau, National Hockey League player

Places
Comeau's Hill, Nova Scotia, a community in Nova Scotia, Canada
Comeau Building, a building in West Palm Beach, Florida
Baie-Comeau, a city in Quebec

Other
Comeau C/C++, a code compiler